Riley is located in Socorro County in the U.S. state of New Mexico.

References

Ghost towns in New Mexico